Fornieles is a surname. Notable people with the surname include:

Ed Fornieles (born 1983), British artist
Mike Fornieles (1932–1998), Cuban-born American Major League Baseball player